Army Stadium may refer to:
Army Stadium (Vietnam)
Army Stadium, Rawalpindi
Army Stadium, Peshawar
Army Stadium (Phnom Penh)
Egyptian Army Stadium